Massaga tenuifascia is a moth of the  family Noctuidae. It is found in the Democratic Republic of Congo and in Zambia.

References
Hampson, G. F. 1910c. Zoological collections from Northern Rhodesia and adjacent territories: Lepidoptera Phalaenae - Proceedings of the Zoological Society of London 1910(2):388–510, pls. 36–41.

Agaristinae
Moths described in 1910